In mathematics, the Romanovski polynomials are one of three finite subsets of real orthogonal polynomials discovered by Vsevolod Romanovsky (Romanovski in French transcription) within the context of probability distribution functions in statistics. They form an orthogonal subset of a more general family of little-known Routh polynomials introduced by Edward John Routh in 1884. The term Romanovski polynomials was put forward by Raposo, with reference to the so-called 'pseudo-Jacobi polynomials in Lesky's classification scheme. It seems more consistent to refer to them as Romanovski–Routh polynomials, by analogy with the terms Romanovski–Bessel and Romanovski–Jacobi used by Lesky for two other sets of orthogonal polynomials.

In some contrast to the standard classical orthogonal polynomials, the polynomials under consideration differ, in so far as for arbitrary parameters only a finite number of them are orthogonal, as discussed in more detail below.

The differential equation for the Romanovski polynomials

The Romanovski polynomials solve the following version of the hypergeometric differential equation

Curiously, they have been omitted from the standard textbooks on special functions in mathematical physics and in mathematics and have only a relatively scarce presence elsewhere in the mathematical literature.

The weight functions are 

they solve Pearson's differential equation 

that assures the self-adjointness of the differential operator of the hypergeometric 
ordinary differential equation.

The Rodrigues formula specifies the polynomial  as

where  is a normalization constant. This constant is related to the coefficient  of the term of degree  in the polynomial  by the expression

Relationship between the polynomials of Romanovski and Jacobi
As shown by Askey this finite sequence of real orthogonal polynomials can be expressed in terms of Jacobi polynomials of imaginary argument and thereby is frequently referred to as complexified Jacobi polynomials. Namely, the Romanovski equation can be formally obtained from the Jacobi equation,

via the replacements, for real , 

in which case one finds

(with suitably chosen normalization constants for the Jacobi polynomials). The complex Jacobi polynomials on the right are defined via (1.1) in Kuijlaars et al. (2003) which assures that are real polynomials in x.
Since the cited authors discuss the non-hermitian (complex) orthogonality conditions only for real Jacobi indexes the overlap between their analysis and definition of Romanovski polynomials exists only if α = 0.  However examination of this peculiar case requires more scrutiny beyond the limits of this article. 
Notice the invertibility of  according to

where, now,  is a real Jacobi polynomial and
 
would be a complex Romanovski polynomial.

Properties of Romanovski polynomials

Explicit construction
by the Rodrigues formula in Equation as

Note that we have chosen the normalization constants , which is equivalent to making a choice of the coefficient of highest degree in the polynomial, as given by equation. It takes the form

 
where ). This observation poses a problem addressed below.

For later reference, we write explicitly the polynomials of degree 0, 1, and 2,

which derive from the Rodrigues formula in conjunction with Pearson's ODE.

Orthogonality

if and only if, 

In other words, for arbitrary parameters, only a finite number of Romanovski polynomials are orthogonal. This property is referred to as finite orthogonality. However, for some special cases in which the parameters depend in a particular way on the polynomial degree infinite orthogonality can be achieved.

This is the case of a version of equation that has been independently encountered anew within the context of the exact solubility of the quantum mechanical problem of the trigonometric Rosen–Morse potential and reported in Compean & Kirchbach (2006).

Finally, the one-dimensional variable, in Compean & Kirchbach (2006) has been taken as

where  is the radial distance, while  is an appropriate length parameter. In Compean & Kirchbach it has been shown that the family of Romanovski polynomials corresponding to the infinite sequence of parameter pairs, 

is orthogonal.

Generating function

In taking into account the relation,

Equation becomes equivalent to

and thus links the complementary to the principal Romanovski polynomials.

The main attraction of the complementary polynomials is that their generating function can be calculated in closed form.

The notational differences between Weber and those used here are summarized as follows:
 here versus  there,  there in place of  here,
, and
 in Equation (15) in Weber corresponding to  here. 
The generating function under discussion obtained in Weber now reads:

Recurrence relations

Recurrence relations between the infinite orthogonal series of Romanovski polynomials with the parameters in the above equations follow from the generating function,

and

as Equations (10) and (23) of Weber (2007) respectively.

See also

 Associated Legendre functions
 Gaussian quadrature
 Gegenbauer polynomials
 Legendre rational functions
 Turán's inequalities
 Legendre wavelet
 Jacobi polynomials
 Legendre polynomials
 Spherical harmonics
 Trigonometric Rosen–Morse potential

References

Special hypergeometric functions
Orthogonal polynomials
Polynomials